Nacional III is a Spanish comedy film from 1982 directed by Luis García Berlanga and written by him together with Rafael Azcona, the third part of the trilogy about the Leguineche family after La escopeta nacional (1978) and Patrimonio nacional (1981).

It was shot in Madrid, Ciudad Real and Biarritz (France), and tells the story of how, after the coup d'état of 23 February and the imminent electoral victory of the Socialists, the Leguineche decide to take their money out of Spain to protect it.

He proposed to make a fourth part about the Leguineche saga, but was frustrated for various reasons. Rafael Azcona and Luis Garcia Berlanga decided to shoot La vaquilla (another film about the Spanish Civil War) first, and the death of the main actor in the saga, Luis Escobar Kirkpatrick, put an end to the project.

Story 
The Marquess of Leguineche has sold his palace for a very humble amount of money and has moved with Luis José, his son, to a flat he has bought next to the Retiro, in Alfonso XII street. They are accompanied by Segundo and Viti, his usual servants, and Father Calvo. Luis José has been separated from his wife, Chus, who is in Extremadura, on his father's estate for some years.

The story begins on 23 February 1981, in the middle of a coup d'état. While Luis José and Segundo plan to patent the "Platoespaña" that will leave them many benefits with the World Cup, Father Calvo longs for a triumph of the coup and Viti, turned from a servant into a lover of the marquess (with the total indifference of her husband), takes care of the house as the owner in pectore that she is.

A telegram notifies them of the sudden death of Chus' father. The whole family moves to Extremadura, to attend the funeral and see if they can get something out of the inheritance. Luis José and Chus reconcile.

Fearing that the socialists would come to power, Chus, following Luis José's instructions, decides to sell his part of the inheritance, convert it into cash and evade the capital to France. They try to do this through a convent and a specialized courier, but finally they will try to camouflage it in the plaster of Luis José, who will travel to Lourdes on a pilgrimage for the sick.

External links 
 
 Nacional III entry at Berlanga Film Museum

References 

1982 comedy-drama films
1982 films
Spanish comedy-drama films
Films directed by Luis García Berlanga
1980s Spanish-language films
Catalan-language films
1982 comedy films
1982 drama films
1980s Spanish films